Tshekardocoleidae is an extinct family of beetles, known from the Permian. They represent amongst the oldest beetles. Like other primitive beetles, they are thought to have been xylophagous. They first appeared during the Cisuralian, before becoming extinct at the beginning of the Guadalupian. A claimed Jurassic record is doubtful. The oldest known beetle, Coleopsis, was originally assigned to this family, but is now assigned to its own family Coleopsidae.

Taxonomy 

Kirejtshuk (2020) included the following genera in Tshekardocoleidae

 †Avocoleus  - Obora site (Permian Sakmarian ); Moravia, Czech Republic
†Avocoleus fractus  (Type species)
†Avocoleus neglegens 
 †Boscoleus  - Obora site (Permian Sakmarian ); Moravia, Czech Republic
†Boscoleus blandus  (Type species)
 †Eocoleus  - Obora site (Permian Sakmarian ); Moravia, Czech Republic 
†Eocoleus scaber  (Type species)
 †Moravocoleus  - Obora site (Permian Sakmarian ); Moravia, Czech Republic
†Moravocoleus permianus  (Type species)
 †Permocoleus  - Midco Member (Permian, Artinskian ); Noble County, Oklahoma, USA
†Permocoleus wellingtoniensis  (Type species)
 †Prosperocoleus  - Obora site (Permian Sakmarian ); Moravia, Czech Republic
†Prosperocoleus prosperus  (Type species)
 †Retelytron  - Obora site (Permian Sakmarian ); Moravia, Czech Republic
†Retelytron conopeum  (Type species)
 †Sylvacoleodes  - Tshekarda site (Permian Kungurian ); Suksun, Perm Krai, Russia 
†Sylvacoleodes admirandus  (Type species)
 †Sylvacoleus  - Tshekarda site (Permian Kungurian ); Suksun, Perm Krai, Russia
†Sylvacoleus richteri  (Type species)
†Sylvacoleus sharovi  
 †Tshekardocoleus  - Tshekarda site (Permian Kungurian ); Suksun, Perm Krai, Russia
†Tshekardocoleus magnus  (Type species)
†Tshekardocoleus minor 
 †Umoricoleus  - Obora site (Permian Sakmarian ); Moravia, Czech Republic
†Umoricoleus perplex  (Type species)
 †Votocoleus  - Obora site (Permian Sakmarian ); Moravia, Czech Republic
†Votocoleus submissus  (Type species)

The genus Uralocoleus had been placed in the family by some authors, but the type species Uralocoleus splendens  was considered incertae sedis by Kirejtshuk (2020) as a possible beetle or cockroach.  The second species placed in the genus "Uralocoleus" ultimus was rejected from placement in Uralocoleus and listed as "genus incertus" ultimus .

References 

†
Prehistoric beetles
Taxa named by Boris Rohdendorf
Tshekardocoleoidea
Prehistoric insect families